Viviana Schiavi (born 1 September 1982) is an Italian football coach and former defender, who most recently played for ASD Mozzanica of Serie A. She previously played for ACF Brescia, ASD Fiammamonza and CF Bardolino.

She was a member of the Italian national team since 2001, and played the 2005 and 2009 European Championships.

Titles
 2 Italian Leagues (2006, 2009)
 2 Italian Cup (2009, 2012)
 2 Italian Supercups (2006, 2008)

References

1982 births
Living people
Italian women's footballers
Italy women's international footballers
Serie A (women's football) players
A.S.D. AGSM Verona F.C. players
Italian expatriate women's footballers
Expatriate women's soccer players in the United States
Footballers from Milan
Women's association football defenders
ASD Fiammamonza 1970 players
Italian expatriate sportspeople in the United States
USL W-League (1995–2015) players